William Barton (16 January 1777 – 7 January 1825) was an English cricketer who played first-class cricket for a large number of sides during the period between 1795 and 1817.

Barton was born at Finsbury in Middlesex in 1777. He is first known to have played cricket for a Middlesex side in 1793 before making his first-class debut in 1795, playing for Middlesex against an MCC side at Lord's Old Ground. He made a total of 37 appearances in first-class matches, including 13 for England sides. He played first-class matches for sides representing Middlesex four times, Surrey three times and once each for Kent and Hampshire sides. Barton is known to have scored 801 runs, with a highest score of 69, and taken at least seven wickets in his career.

Barton died at Westminster in London in 1825. His nephew Robert Barton played a single first-class match for a Middlesex side in 1850.

Notes

References

External links

English cricketers
English cricketers of 1787 to 1825
Middlesex cricketers
1777 births
1825 deaths
Hampshire cricketers
Marylebone Cricket Club cricketers
Kent cricketers
Surrey cricketers
Non-international England cricketers
Epsom cricketers
The Bs cricketers
Gentlemen of England cricketers
R. Leigh's XI cricketers
William Ward's XI cricketers